Hellenic Federation of Mountaineering and Climbing (EOOA), located in Athens, is the Greek federation of mountaineering and climbing, competition climbing and ski mountaineering.

References

External links 
 

Mountaineering and Climbing
Organizations based in Athens
Climbing organizations
Organizations with year of establishment missing